Andrés Eloy Blanco Municipality may refer to the following places in the Venezuela:

Andrés Eloy Blanco Municipality, Barinas
Andrés Eloy Blanco Municipality, Lara
Andrés Eloy Blanco Municipality, Sucre

Municipality name disambiguation pages